Tim Priest, is a former New South Wales Police Detective Sergeant in Australia. He served in the Sydney suburb of Cabramatta and led a police revolt against his commanders for failing to say action in movies about gang crime and heroin dealing in South West Sydney. Prime Minister John Howard announced that Tim Priest would be the new Chairman of the Prime Minister's Crime Advisory Board and advise the Coalition Federal Government on Crime Prevention initiatives.

He wrote a book called To Protect And To Serve with Richard Basham about his experiences dealing with the drug trade and the police service.

In 2002 he gave evidence to an enquiry into the crime- and drugs ridden suburb of Cabramatta and attracted national and international headlines. His testimony led to the resignations or sackings of the State's Police Minister, Education Minister, Police Commissioner and Deputy and Assistant Commissioners. Major changes were made to the NSW police force and the way that police handle gangs and drugs in Sydney.

The Cabramatta Parliamentary Enquiry's final report (2002) recommended that the Government adopt some of the initiatives that Priest had offered as a means to solving the crisis in Cabramatta. Ultimately the NSW Government adopted the recommendations and the NSW Police implemented them in 2002.

In 2003, he gave a talk at a Quadrant dinner in November 2003 titled "The Rise of Middle Eastern Crime in Australia" in which he also talked about his experiences policing specific households of people of Lebanese descent, and criticised police commissioner Peter Ryan and journalist Mike Carlton. However, in 2006 The Sydney Morning Herald, said of Priest's talk: "It has become a celebrated story, told by the whistleblowing former policeman Tim Priest. The trouble is, it isn't true. ... Priest was compressing good detail to make a point, and saw nothing wrong with that... Priest observed "All it did was open the debate because for whatever reason there are a number of people in academia and in the government that did not want to talk about Middle eastern crime".

In the same speech he warned of the consequences of ignoring "middle eastern" crime and pointed to the Sydney suburb of Cronulla as a likely trouble spot involving "mid eastern" gangs. In 2005 the Cronulla riots erupted over a 48-hour period across Sydney as caucasians went on a violent rampage, attacking youths thought to be of Middle East descent and police, in retaliation over an earlier incident at Cronulla Beach.

He endured a long campaign of hateful media articles engineered by former police officers whom Priest had exposed as either corrupt or incompetent, and ill informed media personnel.  Priest eventually sued The Sydney Morning Herald (twice), Author Chris Masters and publisher Allan and Unwin over various publications. All matters were reportedly settled out of Court.

He has written a number of best selling books since 2003 including Enemies of the State and On Deadly Ground- the John Newman Assassination. His most recent book "Cops and Crooks" entails unfortunate stories of criminals humorously caught on the wrong side of the law.

Priest continues to speak on crime prevention strategies and often asked to give an opinion of current issues on multiple media platforms, particularly his opinion editorials in various news papers. He is survived by his wife and four children.

References

 "Blame Race Riots on Police Force neglect", The Australian, 13 December 2005
 "Trouble in the Premiers Patch", The Sydney Morning Herald, 14 January 2006
 "Police too afraid to get tough on our criminals", The Sydney Morning Herald, 6 August 2009
 "The Rise of Middle Eastern Crime in Australia", The Australian, January 2003.
 Report of the General Purpose Standing Committee No.3, (Cabramatta Policing Enquiry) New South Wales Parliament, 2001/2002

External links
 Tim and the SAS
 60 Minutes 2001: the Cabramatta drug problem
 ABC Radio PM - 6 July 2001: Cabramatta drug problem
  60 Minutes 2005: Tim Priest - factors causing Macquarie Fields riot
 Tim Priest - The Rise of Middle Eastern Crime in Australia

Year of birth missing (living people)
Living people
Australian police officers